All Kind of Blues is an album by American blues pianist Memphis Slim which was recorded in 1961 and released on Bluesville, a sublabel of Prestige Records.

Reception

In his review for AllMusic, Stephen Cook says "while newcomers are advised to start out with one of his early-'50s sets on Chess, this will be one collection no Memphis Slim fan will want to overlook."

Track listing 
''All tracks traditional except where noted.
 "Blues Is Troubles" – 3:21    
 "Grinder Man Blues" (Peter Chatman) – 4:32    
 "Three-In-One Boogie" – 4:26 
 "Letter Home" – 3:36    
 "Churnin' Man Blues" – 6:28    
 "Two of a Kind" (Peter Chatman) – 4:12    
 "The Blacks" – 5:08    
 "If You See Kay" – 4:27    
 "Frankie and Johnny Boogie'" – 4:05     
 "Mother Earth" (Peter Chatman) – 4:43

Personnel 
Memphis Slim – vocals, piano

References 

 

1962 albums
Memphis Slim albums
Bluesville Records albums